Daniel O'Donohue may refer to:

 Daniel Anthony O'Donohue (born 1931), United States Ambassador to Burma
 Daniel J. O'Donohue, U.S. Marine lieutenant general